The Technology Innovation Institute (TII) is an Abu Dhabi government funded research institution that operates in the areas of artificial intelligence, quantum computing, autonomous robotics, cryptography, advanced materials, digital science, directed energy and secure systems. The institute is a part of the Abu Dhabi Government’s Advanced Technology Research Council (ATRC).

Formation and activities 
TII was founded in May 2020 and its first Board meeting took place in August 2020. Ray O. Johnson is currently serving as the CEO of the institute. In April 2020, the institute started Citizen Science, an initiative to address the need for specialized medical equipment, data analysis and related technical support in the wake of Covid-19 pandemic. In October 2020, it granted $2.3 million fund to a research group of Purdue University to explore the secure and efficient operations of drones. In December 2020, it announced collaboration with Virgin Hyperloop to explore and implement "localisation of the futuristic transportation method." In March 2021, the institute signed a memorandum of understanding  with Mohamed bin Zayed University of Artificial Intelligence to augment research in Artificial Intelligence.

The institute has seven departments:

Quantum Research Centre 
The quantum research centre has been established with the aim to develop UAE's first quantum computer. In March 2021, it was announced that the first quantum computer will be developed at the Institute's Quantum Research Centre under the supervision of chief researcher Jose Ignacio Latorre and in collaboration with Spanish organization Qilimanjaro Quantum Tech.  The area of operations of Quantum Research Centre includes quantum cryptography, quantum communications and quantum sensing.

Autonomous Robotics Research Centre 
Autonomous robotics research centre deals with the automation and robotics related research and development.

Cryptography Research Centre 
The cryptography research centre dealing in the area of cryptography has developed The National Crypto Library, in December 2020, to secure medical records pertaining to the Covid-19 pandemic. Najwa Aaraj is presently serving as the chief researcher of the centre. During April 2021, the centre developed its second library, a Post-Quantum Cryptography which is a "collection of algorithms to safeguard confidential data and information" keeping the focus on prospective post-quantum era.

Advanced Materials Research Centre 
The AMRC is the department of TII that deals with nanomaterials, self healing materials, smart materials, meta materials, additive manufacturing and energy-absorbing materials and structures. The centre is presently headed by chief researcher Mohamed Al Teneiji.

Digital Science Research Centre 
The primary domain of operation of the  Digital Science Research Centre is in the field of Data science, Computing science, Telecom Science and Cyber-Security Science. It has three units: the AI cross-center Unit, the Digital Security Unit and the Digital Telecom Unit.  The AI  cross-center unit pioneers intelligence in all sectors with 5 programs: Theory and Algorithms, Data Driven Technologies and Intelligent Systems, Exascale Models, Perception, Sensing and Planning as well as AI for good.  The Digital Security Unit  devises Automated  and autonomous  Vulnerability Detection and Mitigation techniques for software and embedded devices. Finally, The Digital Telecom Unity develops advances communication systems for 5G and 6G systems as well as connected vehicles. The center has been at the heart of the development of Noor, the World’s Largest Arabic NLP Model to date.  The center is presently headed by the chief researcher Prof. Merouane Debbah.

Directed Energy Research Centre 
The domain of operation of DERC happen to be electromagnetics, photonics and acoustics. The centre is known for developing the electromagnetic compatibility labs, which is first of its kind in gulf region. The DERC centre is composed of three facilities namely, EMC semi-anechoic chamber, a pulsed power laboratory, and a low-noise emanation laboratory.  The centre is known for working in collaboration with Gulf Cooperation Council, anechoic chambers etc. Presently, the centre is headed by chief researcher Chaouki Kasmi. In May 2021, the centre forged partnership with a number of academic institutions including Ruhr University, Helmut Schmidt University, University Clermont Auvergne, National University of Colombia etc.

Secure Systems Research Centre 
The secure system research centre is known for its operation in hardware hardening, software hardening, system integrity, network resilience etc. The centre is currently headed by chief researcher Shreekant Thakkar. During september 2021, the centre successfully launched first motion capture (MOCAP) facility outside united states. The system is supposed to aid the research related to testing of Unmanned Aerial Vehicles in an augmented reality or virtual reality. In October 2021, the centre announced its partnership with Khalifa University of Science and Technology, University of Turku and Graz University of Technology in relation to the ongoing research projects in secure mesh communications.

References 

Research institutes in the United Arab Emirates
Research institutes established in 2020
Organisations based in Abu Dhabi
2020 establishments in the United Arab Emirates